Lesegno is a comune (municipality) in the Province of Cuneo in the Italian region Piedmont, located about  southeast of Turin and about  east of Cuneo.

Lesegno borders the following municipalities: Castellino Tanaro, Ceva, Mombasiglio, Niella Tanaro, and San Michele Mondovì.

Demographic evolution

References

Cities and towns in Piedmont
Comunità Montana Valli Mongia, Cevetta e Langa Cebana